Ephedra holoptera is a species of Ephedra that is native to Iran.

It was originally described by Harald Udo von Riedl in 1963. It has been placed in section Alatae.

References 

holoptera
Flora of Iran
Plants described in 1963